Kurt Gscheidle (16 December 1924 – 22 February 2003) was a German politician affiliated to the Social Democratic Party (SPD). 

Gscheidle trained as a mechanic with the Deutsche Reichspost until 1942, when he was called up by the Wehrmacht. In 1948 he returned from war captivity, began studies at the Dortmund University of Technology and graduated as an engineer. In 1953 Gscheidle became an official of the Deutsche Bundespost labor union and was elected Vice-Chairman in 1957. He had joined the SPD in 1956, from 1961 until 1969 and again from 1976 to 1980 he was a member of the Bundestag.

In 1969 Gscheidle was a nominee for Chairman of the German Confederation of Trade Unions (DGB) but had to step down in favour of Heinz Oskar Vetter. He then served as a secretary of state at the Ministry of Post and Telecommunications and from 1974 as Minister of Transport (until 1980) and Post and Telecommunications (until 1982) under Helmut Schmidt in the latter's three terms as Federal Chancellor.

Gscheidle stamp
Gscheidle is known among philatelists for a stamp designed on the occasion of the 1980 Summer Olympics in Moscow. As West Germany participated in the Olympics boycott the stamp was never issued, however Gscheidle, then Minister of Post had received some proofs which he kept after his incumbency. From 1982 to 1983 his wife erroneously used about 24 of these stamps for her private correspondence, which today realize peak prices at auctions. In October 2010, one of the Gscheidle stamps was sold for 26,000 euros in Düsseldorf, Germany.

References

External links
Photo and signature
Gscheidle stamp photo

1924 births
2003 deaths
Politicians from Stuttgart
Transport ministers of Germany
Members of the Bundestag for Hesse
Members of the Bundestag for North Rhine-Westphalia
Members of the Bundestag 1976–1980
Members of the Bundestag 1969–1972
Members of the Bundestag 1965–1969
Members of the Bundestag 1961–1965
Technical University of Dortmund alumni
Grand Crosses with Star and Sash of the Order of Merit of the Federal Republic of Germany
Members of the Bundestag for the Social Democratic Party of Germany